Sheldon stone circle is a prehistoric stone circle located to the south of Oldmeldrum in Aberdeenshire, Scotland.

Description 
Sheldon stone circle is also known as Sheildon, Shelden, Shieldon, Sheldon of Bourtie and Sheldon of Bourtree. It is located north of Sheldon farm and lies to the south of Oldmeldrum in Aberdeenshire. Sitting on a knoll, it is a scheduled ancient monument.

The circle has five remaining stones, with two outliers. It is 24 metres in diameter. Researchers followed Alexander Keiller in positing that Sheldon was a recumbent stone circle, despite there being no remaining recumbent. Recent work by Historic Environment Scotland suggests the circle was not a recumbent stone circle.

See also 
Kirkton of Bourtie stone circle

References

External links
Shelden on Canmore
Sheldon on Megalithic Portal.
Shieldon on The Modern Antiquarian

Archaeological sites in Aberdeenshire
Stone Age sites in Scotland
Stone circles in Aberdeenshire
Scheduled Ancient Monuments in Aberdeenshire